Ernst Münch (26 November 1876 – 9 October 1946) was a German plant physiologist who proposed the Pressure Flow Hypothesis in 1930.

He studied in Aschaffenburg, and then in Munich with Robert Hartig. He worked in a number of fields including forest pathology, resin production, and fungi. He is best known for the phloem pressure flow hypothesis.

Works 
 Untersuchungen über Immunität und Krankheitsempfänglichkeit der Holzpflanzen, Dissertation, Ludwigsburg 1909 (doctorate thesis)
 Die Stoffbewegungen in der Pflanze, Jena 1930
 Beiträge zur Forstpflanzenzüchtung. Versuche einer Auslesezüchtung durch Einzelstamm-Absaaten bei Fichte. Weitere Beiträge zur Forstpflanzenzüchtung [Aus dem wissenschaftlichen Nachlass herausgegeben von Bruno Huber], München 1949

Further reading 
 E. Höxtermann: Ernst Münch. In: Ilse Jahn (Hrsg.): Geschichte der Biologie. Theorien, Methoden, Institutionen, Kurzbiografien. 3. Auflage, Spektrum Akademischer Verlag, Heidelberg 2000, S. 909 (Nachdruck Nikol, Hamburg 2004)
 Heinrich Rubner: Ernst Münch. In ders.: Hundert bedeutende Forstleute Bayerns (1875 bis 1970). Mitteilungen aus der Staatsforstverwaltung Bayerns. Bayerisches Staatsministerium für Ernährung, Landwirtschaft und Forsten, München 1994, S. 242–243

20th-century German botanists
1876 births
1946 deaths
German foresters
Plant physiologists